Sir James William Mackey (1816 – 14 December 1892) was an Anglo-Irish merchant and politician. 

Mackey was the son of Stephen Mackey, a Dublin seed merchant, and Catherine Ward. He inherited his father's business in 1854. He was twice Lord Mayor of Dublin, in 1866 and 1873, firstly representing the Irish Liberal Party and secondly for the Irish Conservative Party. He was knighted in 1873. In 1880 Mackey served a term as Sheriff of Dublin City.

In 1847 he married Hannah James Sylvia Jones. Mackey owned 1,377 acres in County Cork. He was a lifelong member of the Royal Dublin Society.

References

1816 births
1892 deaths
19th-century Anglo-Irish people
High Sheriffs of Dublin City
Irish merchants
Irish unionists
Knights Bachelor
Lord Mayors of Dublin